is a landlocked prefecture of Japan located in the Chūbu region of Honshū. Nagano Prefecture borders Niigata Prefecture to the north, Gunma Prefecture to the northeast, Saitama Prefecture to the east, Yamanashi Prefecture to the southeast, Shizuoka Prefecture and Aichi Prefecture to the south, and Gifu Prefecture and Toyama Prefecture to the west.

Nagano is the capital and largest city of Nagano Prefecture, with other major cities including Matsumoto, Ueda, and Iida. Nagano Prefecture has impressive highland areas of the Japanese Alps, including most of the Hida Mountains, Kiso Mountains, and Akaishi Mountains which extend into the neighbouring prefectures. The abundance of mountain ranges, natural scenic beauty, and rich history has gained Nagano Prefecture international recognition as a world-class winter sports tourist destination, including hosting the 1998 Winter Olympics and a new Shinkansen line to Tokyo.

History

Geography 
Nagano is an inland prefecture and it borders more prefectures than any other in Japan, bordering Gunma Prefecture, Saitama Prefecture, Yamanashi Prefecture, and Shizuoka Prefecture to the east, Niigata Prefecture to the north, Toyama Prefecture and Gifu Prefecture to the west, and Aichi Prefecture to the south. Nagano contains the point furthest from the sea in the whole of Japan—this point lies within the city of Saku. The province's mountains have made it relatively isolated, and many visitors come to Nagano for its mountain resorts and hot springs. Nine of the twelve highest mountains in Japan can be found in Nagano and one of its lakes, Lake Kizaki, is a beach resort popular for its water attractions and games. The climate is predominantly alpine with warm summers, cold snowy winters and less intense humidity than the lower lying coastal areas. 

As of 1 April 2014, 21% of the total land area of the prefecture was designated as Natural Parks; namely the Chichibu Tama Kai, Chūbu-Sangaku, Jōshin'etsu Kōgen, and Minami Alps National Parks; Myōgi-Arafune-Saku Kōgen, Tenryū-Okumikawa, and Yatsugatake-Chūshin Kōgen Quasi-National Parks; and Chūō Alps, Enrei Ōjō, Hijiriyama Kōgen, Mibugawa Suikei, Ontake, and Tenryū Koshibu Suikei Prefectural Natural Parks.

Cities

Nineteen cities are located in Nagano Prefecture:

Azumino
Chikuma
Chino
Iida
Iiyama
Ina
Komagane
Komoro
Matsumoto
Nagano (capital)
Nakano
Okaya
Ōmachi
Saku
Shiojiri
Suwa
Suzaka
Tōmi
Ueda

Towns and villages
These are the towns and villages in each district:

Chiisagata District
Aoki
Nagawa
Hanishina District
Sakaki
Higashichikuma District
Asahi
Chikuhoku
Ikusaka
Omi
Yamagata
Kamiina District
Iijima
Minamiminowa
Minowa
Miyada
Nakagawa
Tatsuno
Kamiminochi District
Iizuna
Ogawa
Shinano
Kamitakai District
Obuse
Takayama
Kiso District
Agematsu
Kiso (village)
Kiso (town)
Nagiso
Ōkuwa
Ōtaki
Kitaazumi District
Hakuba
Ikeda
Matsukawa
Otari
Kitasaku District
Karuizawa
Miyota
Tateshina
Minamisaku District
Kawakami
Kitaaiki
Koumi
Minamiaiki
Minamimaki
Sakuho
Shimoina District
Achi
Anan
Hiraya
Matsukawa
Neba
Ōshika
Shimojō
Takagi
Takamori
Tenryū
Toyooka
Urugi
Yasuoka
Shimominochi District
Sakae
Shimotakai District
Kijimadaira
Nozawaonsen
Yamanouchi
Suwa District
Fujimi
Hara
Shimosuwa
Nagano Prefecture is famous for having the largest number of villages in Japan.

Mergers

Demographics 

The life expectancy in Nagano prefecture is the longest nationwide with the average life expectancy of 87.18 years for women and 80.88 years for men.

Transportation

Railway 
East Japan Railway Company
Hokuriku Shinkansen
Shin'etsu Main Line
Chūō Main Line (east line)
Shinonoi Line
Koumi Line
Central Japan Railway Company
Chūō Main Line (west line)
Iida Line
West Japan Railway Company
Ōito Line (from Minami-Otari to )
Shinano Railway
Shinano Railway Line
Nagano Electric Railway
Nagano Line
Matsumoto Electric Railway
Kamikōchi Line
Ueda Dentetsu
Bessho Line

Road

Expressways 

Chuo Expressway
Nagano Expressway
Joshinetsu Expressway
Sanen-nanshin Expressway
Chubu-jukan Expressway
Chubu-odan Expressway

National highways 

Route 18
Route 19 (Nagano-Matsumoto-Shioriri-Nagiso-Nakatsugawa-Tajimi-Nagoya)
Route 20 (Matsumoto-Suwa-Kofu-Otsuki-Hachioji-Nihonbashi of Tokyo)
Route 117
Route 141
Route 142
Route 143 (Matsumoto-Azumino-Ueda)
Route 144
Route 147 (Matsumoto-Omachi)
Route 148 (Omachi-Itoigawa)
Route 151 (Iida-Shinshiro-Toyohashi)
Route 152
Route 153 (Nagoya-Toyota-Iida-Shioriri)
Route 158 (Fukui-Gujo-Takayama-Matsumoto)
Route 254
Route 256 (Gifu-Gujo-Gero-Nakatsugawa-Nagiso-Iida)
Route 403
Route 406 (Omachi-Hakuba-Nagano-Susaka-Tsumagoi-Takasaki)
Route 418 (Ono-Seki-Ena-Iida)

Airports 
Matsumoto Airport

Education

Universities

Public
Shinshu University (National)
Nagano College of Nursing (Prefectural)
The University of Nagano (Prefectural)
Nagano University [Municipal (Ueda City)]
Suwa Tokyo University of Science [Municipal (Chino City)]

Private
Matsumoto University (Private)
Matsumoto Dental University (Private)
Saku University (Private)
Seisen Jogakuin College (Private)

Economy
Nagano Prefecture has a large and diversified economy, with a strong focus on electronics, information technology, precision machinery, agriculture and food products, and tourism, with a total GDP of about trillion (2017).

Several large Japanese groups have production facilities in Nagano Prefecture, such as Citizen Watch (Citizen Group), MinebeaMitsumi, Seiko Epson and Vaio.

Tourism 

Kamikochi
Lake Kizaki
Lake Suwa
Mount Kirigamine
Suwa Taisha, one of the oldest shrines in Japan
Matsumoto Castle, one of Japan's national treasures
One of the world's highest geysers (about 40 to 50 meters) in Suwa
Zenkō-ji temple in Nagano city
Five Mountains of Northern Shinshu

Sports

There are two local J.League clubs: AC Nagano Parceiro and Matsumoto Yamaga FC.

Prefectural symbols 
 Siberian Silver Birch
 Gentian
 Ptarmigan
 Japanese Serow
 Shinano no Kuni (prefecture song)

Sister regions

Changhua County, Taiwan (2008)
Hebei, China
Colorado, USA

Personalities 
 Nagano's former governor, Yasuo Tanaka, is an independent who has made a reputation internationally for attacking Japan's status quo. Among other issues, he has refused national government money for construction projects that he deems unnecessary, such as dams, and has overhauled (locally) the press club system that is blamed for limiting government access to journalists who give favorable coverage. Tanaka was voted out from office on August 6, 2006 and was replaced by Jin Murai.
 Tatsumi Yoda (aka Tom Yoda), former chairman of Avex, is from Chikuma-shi.
 Glim Spanky, the members of the rock band are from Nagano Prefecture
 Yuto Adachi, of Korean boy group Pentagon is from Nagano Prefecture
 Yasuyuki Kazama, a professional drift driver, is from Shimosuwa in Nagano Prefecture.
 Keiichi Tsuchiya, a professional racing driver, is from Tōmi in Nagano Prefecture.
 Bumpei Usui, a professional artist, came from Tōmi in Horikin Village, Minami Azumino County, Nagano Prefecture.
 Jun'ya Ota (aka ZUN), video game developer best known for the Touhou Project series is from Nagano Prefecture.

See also
Matsushiro Underground Imperial Headquarters
Chūō Shinkansen

Notes

References
 Nussbaum, Louis-Frédéric and Käthe Roth. (2005).  Japan encyclopedia. Cambridge: Harvard University Press. ; OCLC 58053128

External links 

Nagano Prefecture Official Website 
Nagano Prefecture Official Website 
Nagano Prefecture Tourism Website 

 
Chūbu region
Prefectures of Japan
Japan campaign